British-born American actor and comedian Bob Hope had a brief boxing career (in 1919) under the name Packy East (named after the popular boxer Packey McFarland). His best result was making it to the finals of the Ohio novice championship in 1919. Hope participated in a few staged bouts later in life.

Boxing record

References

Boxing-related lists
Career achievements of sportspeople
boxing